This is a list of leading magazines published in Indonesia. It is divided into those local to Indonesia, and those that are Indonesian editions of internationally published titles.

Local titles 

Clear - Citibank-backed finance and lifestyle magazine
Indonesia Expat - previously Jakarta Expat and Bali Expat
Bali Plus Magazine

Business 
SWA
Majalah Investor
Globe Asia
Marketing
Marketeers
Investor
MIX
Infobank
Warta Ekonomi
Ide Bisnis
Info Franchise
Komite.id

Agriculture 
Trubus
Trobos Livestock
Trobos Aqua
Agrina
Media Perkebunan
Poultry Indonesia

General 
Intisari

News 
Gatra
Sindo Weekly
Tempo
Forum
Gema
Konstan
Gamma
Panji

Religion 
Suara Muhammadiyah - Islam
Suara Hidayatullah - Islam
Aula - Islam
Bahana - Protestant
Hidup Katolik - Catholic
Sabili - Islam
Hidayah - Islam

Women 
Femina
Kartini
Sekar
Liberty
Pesona
Cita Cinta
Sarinah
Nirmala

Teen 
 HighEnd Teen
 Kawanku
 Gadis
 Aneka Yess!
 Hai
 GoGirl!
 Looks
 Story

Children 
 Mombi
 Mombi SD
 Bobo
 Bobo Junior
 Just for Kids
 CathKids
 Kreatif
 XY Kids
 Aku Anak Saleh
 Mentari

Health 
 Panasea
 Fit

Family 
 Ayahbunda

Housing 
 Idea
 Asri

Computer 
 Info Komputer

Fashion 
 HighEnd
 Dewi
 Prestige Indonesia
 Kebaya
 Noor
 Alia
 Annisa
 Ummi

Men's lifestyle 
 Popular
 BBm
 X2

Sports 
 BolaVaganza
 Sportif
 Main Basket
 Otosport
 Liga Italia
 Liga Inggris

Travel & Lifestyle 
 Panorama
 Destin Asian
 Venue

Film 
 Cinemags

Literature 
 Horison

Automotive 
 Motor
 Scooteriz
 Auto Expert
 Car & Tuning Guide
 Jip
 Carvaganza
 Mobil Motor
 MotoMaxx

Aviation 
 Angkasa
 Airmagz

Music 
 kOrt
 Trax
 News Musik

Education 
 Campus
 Fajar Pendidikan

Entertainment 
 TV Vista
 Film

Technology 
 Audiopro
 Teknologi

International titles 

Anime Insider Indonesia - folded 2011
Animonster - folded September 2014
Auto Bild Indonesia - folded 2017
Autocar Indonesia
Bobo Indonesia
Charlie & Lola Indonesia
CHIP Indonesia
Cleo Indonesia
Komputer Aktif
CosmoGirl Indonesia - teen women's lifestyle magazine - folded 2017
Cosmopolitan Indonesia - women's lifestyle magazine
DA MAN Indonesia
Disney Princess Indonesia
Elle Indonesia - fashion and women's lifestyle magazine
Esquire Magazine Indonesia
Eve Magazine Indonesia
F1 Racing Indonesia
FHM Indonesia - folded 2017
Forbes Indonesia
GameStation - folded December 2016
GADGET+ - folded October 2016
Girlfriend Indonesia
Golf Digest Indonesia
Good Housekeeping Indonesia
HanaLaLa - Indonesian joint edition of Hana to Yume and LaLa manga magazines
HAI - folded June 2017
Harper's Bazaar Indonesia - fashion magazine
Hello! Indonesia
In the Night Garden Indonesia
Indesign Indonesia - Indonesia's leading architecture and design magazine
Indonesian Tatler - spinoff of Tatler
Livingetc Indonesia  - Indonesia's bestselling modern home magazine
Macworld Indonesia
Male Indonesia
Maxim Indonesia
Men's Fitness Indonesia
Men's Health Indonesia - men's health, fitness and lifestyle magazine
Mother and Baby Indonesia
National Geographic Indonesia
Nylon Indonesia
Nylon Guys Indonesia
Parenting Indonesia - parenting magazine
PC Magazine Indonesia
Playboy Indonesia - ceased publishing in March 2007 after threats by extremist groups
Reader's Digest Indonesia - lifestyle magazine
Rolling Stone Indonesia
Seventeen Indonesia - teen women's lifestyle magazine
Shonen Magz Indonesia - manga comics, folded in July 2013
Shonen Star Indonesia - manga comics, folded in 2013
Solitaire Indonesia 
Top Gear Indonesia
Wizard Magazine Indonesia
WOW Indonesia

See also
 Media of Indonesia
 List of newspapers in Indonesia

References

Indonesia
Magazines